Oliveri is an Italian surname.

Notable people 
 Mario Oliveri (born 1944), an Italian Catholic bishop
 Nick Oliveri (born 1971), an American musician from Palm Desert, California
 Robert Oliveri (born 1978), a former American actor

See also 
 Olivieri

Italian-language surnames